Toybox Turbos is a racing video game developed and published by Codemasters. It was released in November 2014.

Gameplay
Toybox Turbos is a racing video game with gameplay similar to the Micro Machines video game series. The game features 18 circuits and 35 vehicles. The game supports local and online multiplayer.

Reception and reviews

The PlayStation 3 version received "generally favorable reviews", while the PC and Xbox 360 versions received "mixed or average reviews", according to the review aggregation website Metacritic.

GamesRadar+ said of the PS3 version, "There is something fundamentally fun about racing tiny cars across a breakfast table and pushing your best mate off it onto the floor...[it] offers immediate multiplayer fun thanks to its mix of racing, weapons and forgiving handling...[but] the single-player mode is not as entertaining."

Eurogamer said that the "handling is appropriately chunky, with enough bounce to be fun, but enough traction that you don't feel out of control...the tracks and race types certainly don't offer enough variation that the decision to favour speed over handling, or vice versa, has any real tactical merit...[but] as a budget-priced reminder of simpler times, Toybox Turbos does everything it needed to, but sadly not much more."

References

External links
 
 

2014 video games
Codemasters games
Multiplayer and single-player video games
PlayStation 3 games
Racing video games
Video games developed in the United Kingdom
Video games scored by Mark Knight
Windows games
Xbox 360 games